Jacques Peretti (born Watford, 1967) is an investigative reporter and broadcaster based in London, United Kingdom. He has written articles for The Guardian, Wired and the Huffington Post.

Broadcasting
His work includes:
 The Trip (1999)
 The Men Who Made Us Fat (2012)
 The Men Who Made Us Thin (2013)
 The Men Who Made Us Spend (2014)
 The Super Rich And Us (2015)
 Britain's Trillion Pound Island - Inside Cayman (2016)
 Who's Spending Britain's Billions? (2016)
 Billion Dollar Deals and How They Changed Your World (2017)
 Michael Jackson: What Really Happened (unknown)
 The Real Michael Jackson (2020)
 "Living like a fan of Michael Jackson" (In process)

Bibliography
 Done: The Billion Dollar Deals and How They're Changing Our World (2017)
 The Deals That Made the World (2018)

References

External links
 

Living people
British reporters and correspondents
British filmmakers
1967 births